is a Japanese multidisciplinary artist. She is known for her photographs and videos of her hybridized future self, often presented in various guises and featuring traditional Japanese motifs. Her work often explores themes of technology, spirituality and transcendence.

In 2010, she founded the Faou Foundation, an art nonprofit based in New York City.

Early life and education
Mariko Mori was born in Tokyo, Japan in 1967. She comes from a wealthy family; her father is an inventor and technician, and her mother is a historian of European Art.

While studying at Bunka Fashion College in Tokyo in the late 1980s, Mori worked as a fashion model. In 1989, she moved to London to study at the Byam Shaw School of Art and then the Chelsea College of Art and Design, from where she graduated in 1992. After graduating, she moved to New York City and participated in the Whitney Independent Study Program at the Whitney Museum of American Art.

Career
Mori's early work references traditional Japanese culture and ancient history but is characterized by futuristic themes and characters. Her early photography is heavily influenced by cosplay. Fantastic deities, robots, alien creatures and spaceships are featured in videos and photographs with the artist herself dressed up in various self-made costumes as characters. Present throughout her career is a fascination with technology and spirituality, with technology as a means of transcending and transforming consciousness and self.

Mori's early works, such as photograph Play with Me (1994), use her own body as the subject, and she costumes herself as a sexualized, technological alien woman in everyday scenes. While her tableaus are fantastic and futuristic, the role played by the female characters she portrayed were often traditional, gendered roles such as a waitress in Tea Ceremony (1995), a futuristic version of the female Buddhist deity Kichijoten in Pure Land (1996-1998), or a female Japanese pop star in Birth of a Star.

Mori attributes her fascination with consciousness and death to experiencing sleep paralysis in her early-twenties for several hours which left her unsure if she was alive or dead.

The juxtaposition of Eastern mythology with Western culture is a common theme in Mori's works, often through layering photography and digital imaging, such as in her 1995 installation Birth of a Star. Later works, such as Nirvana show her as a goddess, transcending her early roles via technology and image, and abandoning realistic urban scenes for more alien landscapes.

At the 47th Venice Biennale (1997), Mori had two works exhibited, a photo collage titled, Empty Dream (1995) shown in the Japanese Pavillon, and the 3-D video installation, Nirvana (1997) which was shown in the Nordic Pavillon.

Mori's work is featured in many public museum collections, including the Solomon R. Guggenheim Museum, Los Angeles County Museum of Art (LACMA), Museum of Contemporary Art, Chicago, and others.

Personal life 
She is married to composer Ken Ikeda. They have created collaborative work together, with Ikeda composing music and/or sound for many of Mori's pieces.

Work

Play With Me (1994) 
Standing outside a Tokyo toy store, Mori dressed herself as a cyborg—with light blue hair in long ponytails, metallic blue hard-shell plastic top, silver plastic gloves, and a dress. Mori dresses similarly to the toys sold inside the store, while being ignored by the patrons who are entering to her left.

Subway (1994) 
Mori stood in a Tokyo subway car dressed as if she just landed from outer space. She was dressed in a silver metallic costume with a headset, microphone, and push-buttons on her forearm. This transformation—along with Play With Me—was to explore different constructed identities.

Empty Dream (1995) 
Mori manipulates a photo of a real public swimming place as she inserts herself in a blue plastic mermaid costume in several locations within the scene. This image refers to, among other things, the rising of technology and philosophy around the creation of man through biotechnology. This work was one of two by Mori that were featured at the 47th Venice Biennale (1997).

Oneness (2003) 
Oneness, which was first exhibited at Deitch Projects, New York, in 2003, is also the title of a group of six alien sculptures—made from soft, skin-like material—that hold each other’s hands in a circle. They are sensitive to human touch, lighting up when hugged.  Oneness presents the dimensions of spirituality, photography and fashion into a deep look on the originality of the artist's skill hence the usage of technology's brand new trends. The outlook designs of Oneness gathers the capacity nevertheless the ability to use advanced technology knowledge converted to some sort of mystic and UFOs.

Including in Oneness you can find some sub-works such as the Wave-UFO, a 6.000 kg dome where the visitor, once inside it, can see projected paintings reworked with computer graphics and then transformed into photographs in the interior dome of the Wave UFO. Conceptualization and prototyping of the Wave UFO was realized during Mori's residency at Eyebeam Art+Technology Center in Chelsea, New York.

Rebirth 
Rebirth is an exhibition from works spanning a number of years that was first shown in London at the Royal Academy of Art in 2012 and came to Japan Society in New York City in 2013. It is seen as a major departure from her previous work in that has far less to do with contemporary media and influences. One such example in this collection is Flat Stones (2006), which is a collection of ceramic rocks arranged similarly to a Jomon archaeological site. Mori also took inspiration from ancient Celtic practices, notably the stone circles in her Transcircle 1.1 (2004), a group of LED lit columns that periodically shift color. Such engagement with prehistoric cultures derive from her search for universal values shared by humanity.

Faou Foundation
In 2010, Mori founded a 501(c)(3) non-profit organization, the Faou Foundation, (the word "faou" is a neologism created by Mori meaning "creative force"). Mori is listed as founder and president of the organization. Inspired by Buddhism and ecology, the Faou Foundation's mission is to create six art installations around the world as homages to the natural environment of each locale.

Awards and honors 
 1997 – Menzione d’onore, for her work Nirvana (1997), Venice Biennale
 2001 – 8th Annual Award as a "Promising Artist and Scholar in the Field of Contemporary Japanese Art", Japan Cultural Arts Foundation

Publications

References

External links
 Video: The Artist Project: Mariko Mori on Botticelli's The Annunciation from The Met
 Rebirth: Recent Work by Mariko Mori at Streaming Museum
 Her sculpture Tom Na H-iu, driven by the Super-Kamiokande neutrino observatory
 Mariko Mori at Brooklyn Museum of Art: Review of exhibition Empty Dream, Asian Art News, November 1999
 Mariko Mori: Dream Temple, 22 May – 15 Jun 1999, Fondazione Prada, Milan, Italy

1967 births
Living people
20th-century Japanese women artists
21st-century Japanese women artists
Japanese contemporary artists
Japanese video artists
Artists from Tokyo
Alumni of the Byam Shaw School of Art
Alumni of Chelsea College of Arts
Buddhist artists